Mukayras in Arabic مكيراس  is a town and Directorate "مديرية" in Al Bayda Governorate, Yemen.
It was one of the South Yemen Protectorates under British rule from 1839-1967.

Populated places in Abyan Governorate
Villages in Yemen